Dolichyl-diphosphooligosaccharide—protein glycosyltransferase subunit 2, also called ribophorin ǁ is an enzyme that in humans is encoded by the RPN2 gene.

Function 
This gene encodes a type I integral ribophorin membrane protein found only in the rough endoplasmic reticulum. The encoded protein is part of an N-oligosaccharyl transferase complex that links high mannose oligosaccharides to asparagine residues found in the Asn-X-Ser/Thr consensus motif of nascent polypeptide chains. This protein is similar in sequence to the yeast oligosaccharyl transferase subunit SWP1. RPN2 has been demonstrated to be a prognostic marker of human cancer, and may be a potential target of clinical importance.

Structure

Gene 

The RPN2 gene lies on the chromosome location of 20q11.23 and consists of 19 exons.

Protein 
RPN2 consists of 631 amino acid residues and weighs 69284Da.

Function 
RPN2 is a unique integral glycoprotein in rough ER membrane that is involved in translocation and the maintenance of the structural uniqueness of the rough ER. It is also an essential subunit of N-oligosaccharyl transferase complex that conjugates high mannose oligosaccharides to asparagine residues in the N-X-S/T consensus motif of nascent polypeptide chains. RPN2 regulates the glycosylation of multi-drug resistance, and thus its interference could decrease the membrane localization of P-glycoprotein by reducing its glycosylation status and restored the sensitivity to docetaxel.

Clinical significance 
RPN2 has been demonstrated to be a prognostic marker of human cancer. RPN2 is highly expressed in breast cancer stem cells and is associated with tumor metastasis. Recent study has shown that its expression is correlated with clinically aggressive features of breast cancer, implying a possible application in personalized medicine. RPN2 silencing has been reported to repress tumorigenicity and to sensitize the tumors to cisplatin treatment, which led to the longer survival of NSCLC-bearing mice, suggesting that RPN2 may represent a promising new target for RNAi-based medicine against NSCLC. Similar potential application has also been shown in osteosarcoma, esophageal squamous cell carcinoma and colorectal cancer. RPN2 is also reported to be one of the prothrombin-binding proteins on monocyte surfaces, suggesting that its involvement in the pathophysiology of thrombosis in patients with APS.

Interactions 
P53

tetraspanin CD63 

prothrombin

Model organisms 

Model organisms have been used in the study of RPN2 function. A conditional knockout mouse line, called Rpn2tm1a(EUCOMM)Wtsi was generated as part of the International Knockout Mouse Consortium program — a high-throughput mutagenesis project to generate and distribute animal models of disease to interested scientists.

Male and female animals underwent a standardized phenotypic screen to determine the effects of deletion. Twenty six tests were carried out on mutant mice and two significant abnormalities were observed.  No homozygous mutant embryos were identified during gestation, and therefore none survived until weaning. The remaining tests were carried out on heterozygous mutant adult mice; no additional significant abnormalities were observed in these animals.

References

Further reading 

 
 
 
 
 
 
 
 

Genes mutated in mice